Otto Lee "Tubby" Rohsenberger (November 6, 1896 – January 15, 1954) was player in the National Football League. He played with the Evansville Crimson Giants during the 1921 NFL season.

References

Sportspeople from Evansville, Indiana
Evansville Crimson Giants players
Wisconsin Badgers football players
1896 births
1954 deaths